Sargatskoye, colloquially known as Sargatka, is an urban locality (a work settlement) and the administrative center of Sargatsky District of Omsk Oblast, Russia, located  north of Omsk along the Irtysh River. Population:

Geography
Sargatskoye is located about half-way between Omsk and Bolsherechye, and is a stopping point for automobile and river travelers.

References

Urban-type settlements in Omsk Oblast